A refuge island, also known as a pedestrian refuge or pedestrian island, is a small section of pavement or sidewalk, surrounded by asphalt or other road materials, where pedestrians can stop before finishing crossing a road. It is typically used when a street is very wide, as the pedestrian crossing can be too long for some individuals to cross in one traffic light cycle. They may also be seen on roads with higher speed limits. In the United Kingdom, refuge islands are commonly illuminated by a white 300 mm beacon mounted on a 5 m grey pole with white reflective bands. 

Refuge islands may also be used when no light exists and pedestrians need safe harbour after managing one direction of traffic and before taking on the next. This significantly improves amenity for pedestrians trying to cross busy streets, as they are much more likely to find two small gaps in traffic rather than one situation in which gaps for both directions coincide. Since this reduces pedestrians' average waiting time, it also improves safety, with impatient pedestrians less likely to use gaps that turn out to be too short for safe crossing.

See also

Traffic island
Traffic sign
Traffic light
Road surface marking
Sneckdown

References 

Traffic calming
Road infrastructure
Pedestrian crossing components